Đồng Hới station is one of the main railway stations on the North–South railway (Reunification Express) in Vietnam. It serves the city of Đồng Hới, the provincial capital of Quảng Bình Province. The station is 450 km south of Hanoi, 160 km north of Huế, 1280 km north of Saigon station. The station is located 3 km West, inland, from the coast and downtown.

References

Railway stations in Vietnam
Buildings and structures in Quảng Bình province
Đồng Hới